The Ferrari 640 (also known as the Ferrari F1-89) was the Formula One racing car with which the Ferrari team competed in the 1989 Formula One World Championship. It was driven by Britain's Nigel Mansell, in his first season with the team, and Austria's Gerhard Berger, winning three races between them.

Design

The car was designed by John Barnard, and it was the first Ferrari he was responsible for designing. It sported a sharp nose, with a narrow monocoque and bulging side-pods designed to house the radiators with maximum aerodynamic efficiency. It originally had two small air intakes on either side of the driver, but from the fourth race of the season in Mexico a more conventional large air intake above and behind the driver was introduced, which Ferrari kept on the car for the remainder of the season.

Barnard, who had joined Ferrari from McLaren at the end of the  season, had begun designing the car in 1987 with the intent of it being used during the  season. However, continual problems with the car's revolutionary electrohydraulic-actuated semi-automatic gearbox saw the team forced to use the turbocharged F1/87/88C in 1988, with the car's debut pushed back to 1989, the first year of FISA's 3.5 Litre atmospheric formula where turbos were banned.

The transmission to which it was mated, however, attracted more attention, as it contained the very first true sequential-style paddle-shift gearbox seen in Formula 1. In the first half of the season, the experimental system proved to be very unreliable, and it hampered Ferrari's efforts. However, such gearboxes would become the norm by the mid-1990s. Much of the development work was conducted at Ferrari's private test track Fiorano by test driver Roberto Moreno during the winter season (Moreno also doubled as the lead driver of the small, cash-strapped Coloni team). By the time the Grand Prix circus returned to Europe at the end of June, the problem with the semi-automatic gearbox was found to be not enough power from the battery. With the help of electrical experts from team sponsor Magneti Marelli, the power supply to the gearbox was fixed and the 640's reliability rose accordingly.

Race history
The car proved to be fast, and Mansell took it to victory in its début race in Brazil, despite fears of unreliability (the potential of the new car, with its innovative aerodynamics, gearbox, and V12 engine was clear - Mansell declared on the eve of the Brazilian race that if "the car had even half the horsepower it sounds like it has, we'll win every race this year..."). However, it did not record another finish until the French Grand Prix, and there were to be no races in which both drivers finished. But when the car did finish, it did so in a position no lower than third, with Mansell taking second in both France and his home race at Silverstone, third in Germany where the long straights saw the Ferrari V12 almost breathless against the more powerful Honda V10s (though they still had the advantage over the Renault V10s of Williams and the Ford V8 powered Benettons), a second win in Hungary which was highlighted by his passing move on Senna to take the lead, and finally third at Spa, before Berger finished second at Monza, won in Portugal - a race where the Ferraris were clearly more competitive than the championship-winning McLarens - and finished second again in Spain.

The carbon fibre monocoque also proved to be very strong, allowing Berger to escape from a fiery high-speed crash at Imola with only minor burns to his hands and a couple of broken ribs. In a 2013 interview, Berger revealed the reason for the crash was the front wing had broken on the car, though as the right front wheel had risen his initial thought was rear suspension failure or a flat left rear tyre. He then revealed that even in the short time it took from the car not responding to the time it hit the wall, he also realised the car was almost full of fuel and could catch fire. From then he was briefly knocked unconscious, but was awake and aware only a minute or so later. Berger's injuries were enough to keep him out of the Monaco Grand Prix, but with the help of Niki Lauda's physiotherapist Willy Dungl and the semi-automatic gearbox's advantage of not having to take his hands off the steering wheel to change gears, the Austrian was able to return one race later in Mexico.

According to Barnard, he had been searching for a way to eliminate the old manual transmission in racing cars since he had designed the Chaparral 2K that had taken Johnny Rutherford to victory in the 1980 Indianapolis 500. This was purely from an aerodynamic perspective as the manual transmission (usually located on the drivers' right-hand side) had meant that a car's monocoque had to be wider than desirable to accommodate the stick shift and its link to the gearbox located at the rear of a car. The semi-automatic transmission with its paddle-shifters located behind the steering wheel, along with an electrohydraulically-operated clutch pedal, had eliminated the need for this and had allowed Barnard to design the Ferrari with its distinctive sharp nose.

At the end of the season, Mansell was fourth in the Drivers' Championship with 38 points, while Berger was seventh with 21. Berger, third in the 1988 Drivers' Championship, only finished 3 races during the season and retired from 10 of the first 11 races (missing Monaco). His first points came in Round 12 at Monza with a second-place before winning in Portugal and finishing 2nd again in Spain. Ferrari battled with Williams for second in the Constructors' Championship for much of the year but ultimately settled for third, with 59 points. Ferrari lost 2nd in the Constructors' Championship when both Mansell and Berger failed to finish the final two races of the year in Japan and Australia, while both Williams drivers finished second and third at Suzuka, and first and third in Adelaide.

For the  season, the 640 was replaced with the 641.

Complete Formula One results
(key) (results in bold indicate pole position; results in italics indicate fastest lap)

References

External links 

 
 Ferrari F1-89

640